Yolanda Whitaker, also known as Yo-Yo (born August 4, 1971) is an American rapper and actress.

Much of Yo-Yo's music advocates female empowerment. She is the protégé of gangsta rapper Ice Cube. Yo-Yo has dubbed her crew the IBWC, Intelligent Black Woman's Coalition.

Career

Music
Yo-Yo first appeared as a guest on Ice Cube's 1990 debut studio album AmeriKKKa's Most Wanted on the track "It's a Man's World". Cube returned the favor by appearing on "You Can't Play with My Yo-Yo", on Yo-Yo's 1991 debut album, Make Way for the Motherlode. Each of the videos for the singles from the album were directed by Okuwah Garrett of Power Films.

Her follow-up album released in 1992, Black Pearl, was well received by critics, partly because of its focus on positive messages and uplifting themes that heavily contrasted with the popular gangsta rap style at the time. Despite a plethora of renowned producers such as DJ Muggs, this failed to translate into a hit with mainstream hip-hop audiences, and the album's sales were considered a disappointment.

Less than a year later, Yo-Yo released her follow-up album, titled You Better Ask Somebody. The final track on the album was her third recorded hip-hop duet with Ice Cube, "The Bonnie and Clyde Theme".

Yo-Yo's next album, Total Control, was released in 1996. In 1998, Yo-Yo finished her fifth studio album, Ebony, though it was not released. In 2008, her single, "You Can't Play With My Yo-Yo" was ranked number 92 on VH1's 100 Greatest Hip-Hop Songs. Later that year, she performed with MC Lyte, The Lady of Rage, and Salt-N-Pepa at the BET Hip Hop Awards.

As of 2009, Yo-Yo has been working on an EP, titled My Journey to Fearless: The Black Butterfly.

In 2013, it was announced she joined the upcoming BET reality series Hip Hop Sisters which will focus on six female rappers' lives and their attempts to relaunch their careers. Other rappers confirmed to appear are MC Lyte, Lady of Rage, Monie Love, Lil Mama, and Smooth.

Acting
Yo-Yo appeared in the 1991 film Boyz n the Hood. She had a recurring role on the television show Martin as Keylolo, the sidekick to comedian Martin Lawrence's alter ego Sheneneh. Yo-Yo also appeared on other TV shows, including the Fox network's New York Undercover. She made a cameo appearance in the music video for Missy Elliot's "The Rain (Supa Dupa Fly)". She also appeared in the 2004 video game Grand Theft Auto: San Andreas as the voice of Kendl Johnson.

Personal life
Yo-Yo dated Tupac Shakur for some time in the 1990s. She was with Shakur in the hospital shortly before he died. Later, Yo-Yo became engaged to DeAndre Windom, the former mayor of Highland Park, Michigan, in August 2012. The two married on August 17, 2013 in the Cayman Islands and divorced in 2018.

Yo-Yo has been active in advocating for hip-hop artists to become involved within their community. Notably, she testified in 1994 for a Senate Judiciary Committee hearing about whether the government should require rating labels on gangsta rap. She also founded the Yo-Yo School of Hip-Hop to use hip-hop in curriculum for at-risk students.

Discography

Studio albums
 Make Way for the Motherlode (1991)
 Black Pearl (1992)
 You Better Ask Somebody (1993)
 Total Control (1996)

Filmography

Film

Television

Video Games

Awards and nominations

References

Notes

Citations

External links

Yo-Yo School of Hip Hop

1971 births
American women rappers
African-American women rappers
African-American actresses
Living people
Actresses from Los Angeles County, California
Musicians from Compton, California
Rappers from California
Songwriters from California
West Coast hip hop musicians
American film actresses
American television actresses
American video game actresses
American voice actresses
20th-century American rappers
20th-century American women musicians
20th-century American actresses
21st-century American rappers
21st-century American women musicians
21st-century American actresses
African-American songwriters
20th-century African-American women
20th-century African-American people
21st-century African-American women
21st-century African-American musicians
Feminist rappers
20th-century women rappers
21st-century women rappers